The 1997 Tour de Romandie was the 51st edition of the Tour de Romandie cycle race and was held from 6 May to 11 May 1997. The race started in Kriegstetten and finished in Geneva. The race was won by Pavel Tonkov of the Mapei team.

General classification

References

1997
1997 in Swiss sport